This is a list of the location of sections concerning branch lines embedded in other articles. Branch lines with separate articles are listed in the box below in the 'Country branch lines' section.

Branch line terminus stations
Aramac Tramway - Central Western railway line, Queensland#Branch lines

Ballara - Great Northern Railway (Mt Isa line)#Branch lines

Barakula - Western railway line, Queensland#Branch lines

Blair Athol - Central Western railway line, Queensland#Branch lines

Broadmount - North Coast railway line, Queensland#Branch lines

Brooloo - North Coast railway line, Queensland#Branch lines

Clermont - Central Western railway line, Queensland#Branch lines

Dajarra - Great Northern Railway (Mt Isa line)#Branch lines

Dayboro - Ferny Grove railway line

Ebenezer - Main Line railway#Branch lines

Emu Park - North Coast railway line, Queensland#Branch lines

Greenvale - North Coast railway line, Queensland#Branch lines

Kilcoy - North Coast railway line, Queensland#Branch lines

Millaa Millaa - Tablelands railway line, Queensland#Millaa Millaa branch line

Mt Crosby - Main Line railway#Branch lines

Mt Garnet - Tablelands railway line, Queensland#Private railways

Mt Molloy - Tablelands railway line, Queensland#Private railways

Mt Mulligan - Tablelands railway line, Queensland#Private railways

Phosphate Hill - Great Northern Railway (Mt Isa line)#Branch lines

Port Alma - North Coast railway line, Queensland#Branch lines

Ravenswood - Great Northern Railway (Mt Isa line)#Branch lines

Ridgelands - North Coast railway line, Queensland#Branch lines

Rumula - Tablelands railway line, Queensland#Private railways

Quilpie - Western railway line, Queensland#Branch lines

Springsure - Central Western railway line, Queensland#Branch lines

Tivoli - Main Line railway#Branch lines

Trekalano - Great Northern Railway (Mt Isa line)#Branch lines

Yaraka - Central Western railway line, Queensland#Branch lines

Yeppoon - North Coast railway line, Queensland#Branch lines

External links
 1925 map of the Queensland railway system

See also
Rail transport in Queensland

Railway lines in Queensland
Closed railway lines in Queensland
Railway branch line locations